This list of unsolved deaths includes well-known cases where:
 The cause of death could not be officially determined.
 The person's identity could not be established after they were found dead.
 The cause is known, but the manner of death (homicide, suicide, accident, overdosing) could not be determined.
 Different official investigations have come to different conclusions.

Cases where there are unofficial alternative theories about deaths – the most common theory being that the death was a homicide – can be found under: Death conspiracy theories.

Unsolved murders

Unsolved deaths

Ancient
 Cleopatra (39), the last ruler of Ptolemaic Egypt, is believed to have died in August 30 BCE in Alexandria. According to popular belief, Cleopatra committed suicide by allowing an asp (Egyptian cobra) to bite her. According to Greek and Roman historians, Cleopatra poisoned herself using either a toxic ointment or sharp implement such as a hairpin. Primary source accounts are derived mainly from the works of the ancient Roman historians Strabo, Plutarch, and Cassius Dio. Modern scholars debate the validity of ancient reports involving snakebites as the cause of death and whether she was murdered. Some academics hypothesize that her Roman political rival Octavian forced her to commit suicide in the manner of her choosing. The location of Cleopatra's tomb is unknown.
 Amcotts Moor Woman is the name of a bog body of a female who lived during 200–400 CE that was discovered in a bog close to Amcotts, Lincolnshire, England, in 1747. Almost no details are known about her and the cause of her death remains a mystery.
The cause of the death is unknown. Through recent DNA tests, this mummy has been identified as the mother of the pharaoh Tutankhamun and a daughter of pharaoh Amenhotep III and Queen Tiye. Early speculation that these were the remains of Queen Nefertiti has been disproven.
 Windeby I (16), is the name given to the bog body in 1952 that was preserved in a peat bog close to Windeby located in Northern Germany containing the remains of a teenage male who lived between 41 BCE and 118 CE. His death cause is disputed and unknown.
 Zoroaster (76), was an ancient male Iranian prophet who lived during 1000 BCE and who was said to perform miracles; he founded the religion now known as Zoroastrianism. Zoroaster's cause of death is unknown; it is said that Zoroaster was killed by invading Turanians around the time that he was last seen, but this was never confirmed.
 The Hasanlu Lovers are the remains of two humans found in Teppe Hasanlu, Iran, in 1972 who are thought to have died . While it has been suggested that they died from asphyxiation, no definitive cause of death has been established.
 Damendorf Man is a German bog body discovered in 1900 in the See Moor at the village of Damendorf in Schleswig-Holstein, Germany, who was said to have died in 300 BCE. Only his hair, skin, and nails and his few clothes were preserved, along with traces of some bones. He was found with a leather belt, shoes, and a pair of breeches. The man's identity and cause of death are unknown.
 The Girl of the Uchter Moor (17–19), who is also known as "Moora", is the name given to the remains of a female bog body discovered in the marshland near Uchte, Germany, in 2000. She lived during the Iron Age and died between 764 and 515 BCE; the cause of her death is unknown.
 The Borremose bodies are three bog bodies that were found in 1946 and 1948 in Himmerland, Denmark, in the Borremose peat bog. They have been dated to have lived in the Nordic Bronze Age during 770 BCE. The causes of their deaths are unknown.
 The Saltmen are the remains of six men who lived during the remainder of the Achaemenid Dynasty (550–330 BCE) that were found in 2010 in the salt mines in Chehrabad on the southern part of the Hamzehlu village in the Zanjan Province in Iran. Though it is known that most of them were accidentally killed by the collapse of galleries where they worked, the causes of the deaths of the other saltmen remain unknown.
 Alexander the Great (32), died in 323 BCE after a short illness. Exactly what the illness was is a subject of debate; however, it is known that he was a heavy drinker throughout his life.
 The Weerdinge Men were two bog bodies found naked in the southern part of Bourtanger Moor in Drenthe in the Netherlands in 1904. Though one of the men is known to have been murdered, the cause of the other man's death is unknown. They died between 160 BCE and 220 CE.
 In October 2018 human remains were found in Rome that were thought to possibly be the remains of Emanuela Orlandi and Mirella Gregori, who disappeared from Rome between 7 May 1983 and 22 June 1983. Early reports said the remains could have belonged to a female, but tests results that were released on 1 February 2019 showed they were of an ancient Roman man who died between 190 and 230 CE whose identity and cause of death are unknown.
 Orgetorix, 58 BCE, was a wealthy aristocrat among the Helvetii, a Celtic-speaking people residing in what is now Switzerland during the consulship of Julius Caesar of the Roman Republic. He was trying to seize Gaul and for this was put on trial. After this his death cause is disputed.
 Apollonius of Tyana (100), 100 CE, was a Greek Neopythagorean philosopher from the town of Tyana in the Roman province of Cappadocia in Anatolia. It was said that he was able to disappear and immediately reappear in another place. The circumstances of his death remain a mystery.

Medieval
 The Lovers of Modena are two male skeletons found in Rome, Italy in 2009, who are thought to have lived between the 4th and 6th-century CE. Their cause of death is unknown.
 Princess Yongtai (15–16), 701. In both the Old Book of Tang and New Book of Tang, it is recorded that she was executed by Empress Wu Zetian with her brother and husband because of talking about the gossips about the two officials Zhang Yizhi and Zhang Changzong, who were also the lovers of Empress Wu Zetian. However, from her epitaph, it was said she was pregnant while she died. From a piece of her pelvic bone, it has been presumed that she died from childbirth, because her pelvis seems to be smaller than other women at the same age. It is also suspected that she went into shock on hearing the news that her brother and husband had been executed, and it caused a fatal miscarriage.
 Emperor Taizu of Song (49), the first emperor of Song Dynasty, died in 976. There are no records about how he died. However, his younger brother was granted the throne due to the fact that he had two grown sons. There is a folk story "shadows by the candle and sounds from an axe" possibly indicating that he was murdered by his brother, but it may also have been a suicide.
 Roopkund is a high altitude glacial lake in the Uttarakhand state of India. It lies in the lap of Trishul massif, located in the Himalayas. It is widely known for the hundreds of ancient human skeletons found at the edge of the lake. The human skeletal remains are visible at its bottom when the snow melts. Research generally points to a semi-legendary event where a group of people were killed in a sudden, violent hailstorm in the 9th century. Studies placed the time of mass death around the 9th century CE (1,200 years old) and second group of skeletons were dated to 19th century CE. The skeletons identities are unknown, but radiocarbon dating suggests that the older remains were deposited over an extended period or time, while the remains of the younger group were deposited during a single event.
 King William II of England (43–44), 1100, was killed by an arrow while hunting; it may or may not have been an accident.
Pieces of a human skull that were found on 12 August 2006 by a farmer in a field south of Ritzville were thought to be that of Sofia Juarez (4), who disappeared on 4 February 2003 After being examined they were concluded to around 600 years old dating back to roughly 1403 and were determined not to be those of Juarez. Whom they belonged to and cause of death remains unknown.
 Margaret Hanmer (49–50), 1420, was the wife of Owain Glyndŵr; her death was never recorded and her body was never found.
 Agnès Sorel (28), 1450, was a French woman who had committed adultery with King Charles VII of France, having four daughters with him. Sorel died on 9 February 1450 from causes that are disputed.

Early modern
 The Lovers of Cluj-Napoca (30s), a nickname given to two skeletons found in a former Dominican convent in Cluj-Napoca, Romania in 2013, are thought to have lived between 1450 and 1550. Their exact causes of death are unclear.
 Kwäday Dän Ts'ìnchi (17–20), 1450–1700, also known as "The Canadian Iceman" is a naturally mummified body found by a group of hunters in 1999 in the Tatshenshini-Alsek Park in British Columbia, Canada. His death cause is unknown.
Henry Holland, 3rd Duke of Exeter (45), a Lancastrian while sailing through the English channel in September 1475 died after mysteriously falling overboard and drowning. Though there are different theories to what happened, none were ever proved to be true.
 Regiomontanus (40), whose real name was "Johannes Müller von Königsberg"  was a astrologer, mathematician, and astronomer of the German Renaissance that was active in countries in Europe. He was thought to have died from the plague on 6 July 1476, but this is unknown for sure.
 Princes in the Tower, used to refer to Edward V, King of England and Richard of Shrewsbury, Duke of York who disappeared in the summer of 1483. In 1674, workmen at the Tower dug up a wooden box containing two small human skeletons. The bones were found in a box under the staircase in the Tower of London. The bones were widely accepted at the time as those of the princes, but this has not been proven and is far from certain. King Charles II had the bones buried in Westminster Abbey, where they remain.
 Amy Robsart (28), 1560, was the first wife of Lord Robert Dudley, favourite of Queen Elizabeth I of England. She is primarily known for her death by falling down a flight of stairs, the circumstances of which have often been regarded as suspicious.
 The Gunnister Man are the bog body remains of man found in a peat bog close to the junction of the A970 road located in Gunnister, Shetland, Scotland by two Shetlanders. The man had lived in the 17th and early 18th century and how he died is unknown.
 Cornelia Zangheri Bandi (66), was an Italian noblewoman whose death on 15 March 1731 may have been a possible case of spontaneous human combustion. But the case has never been proven, with the true cause of death remaining unknown.
 Wolfgang Amadeus Mozart (35), composer, died on 5 December 1791. The circumstances of his death have attracted much research and speculation, as it remains unclear whether he died from disease or poisoning. There have also been conspiracy theories.

19th century

 Meriwether Lewis (35), an American explorer who helped explore territory bought during the Louisiana Purchase, was found dead with multiple gunshot wounds in an inn along the Natchez Trace in 1809, a nature trail in Tennessee. Though it was originally declared a suicide, historians debate whether it was murder or suicide due to the nature of his injuries and the lack of a thorough autopsy.
 The Female Stranger (23), refers to an unnamed American woman who died in 1816 and was elevated to national intrigue by the mysterious headstone and romanticized tale. Accounts of the stranger increase in oddity over time and help to incite further speculation as to the identity of the person buried in the grave. The reported location of the woman's death, Room 8 at Gadsby's Tavern, is also a tourist destination, and supposedly her ghostly visage can be seen standing at the window.
 A boat with three skeletons of sailors was discovered that washed up on Ducie Island during the 1820s–1830s, who are thought to be Obed Hendricks, William Bond and Joseph West from the whaler Essex. Although it was suspected to be the missing boat piloted by Hendricks, and the corpses those of Hendricks, Bond, and West, the remains have never been positively identified.
For several weeks after 22 April 1822, unidentifiable dead bodies washed up off the coast of Ireland. They were believed to include that of Charles Lefebvre-Desnouettes (58), who had recently traveled, and perhaps died, there. This was never confirmed and their cause of death remains unknown.
 Paul Johann Anselm Ritter von Feuerbach (57), German legal scholar, died on 29 May 1833. The circumstances remain unclear – his family as well as he himself shortly before his death believed that he had been poisoned due to his protection of and research work on Kaspar Hauser, who himself died the same year under suspicious circumstances (see below).
 The events that led to the death of German youth Kaspar Hauser (21), remain a mystery, just like many other points regarding his life and identity. On 14 December 1833, he came home with a deep stab wound in his chest of which he died three days later. While he had claimed to have been attacked, the court of enquiry doubted this due to inconsistencies in his claims and speculated that he wounded himself in order to seek attention and revive the fading public interest in him, a theory that is also supported by some historians today.
 Thomas Simpson (31), was a Scottish Arctic explorer, Hudson's Bay Company agent and cousin of Company Governor Sir George Simpson. His violent death in what is now the state of Minnesota allegedly by suicide after gunning down two traveling companions in the wilderness on 6 June 1840 has long been a subject of controversy and has never been solved.
 John Gregory (42), was an English engineer who served aboard HMS Erebus during the 1845 Franklin Expedition, which sought to explore uncharted parts of the Northwest Passage. He is believed to have died sometime around May 1848. Gregory's remains were identified via DNA analysis in 2021, although his exact cause of death is undetermined.

 Edgar Allan Poe (40), American writer, editor, and literary critic, died on 7 October 1849 under circumstances that remain mysterious. The circumstances leading up to it are uncertain and the cause of death is disputed. On 3 October 1849 he was found delirious in Baltimore, "in great distress, and... in need of immediate assistance", according to the man who found him, Joseph W. Walker. He was taken to the Washington College Hospital, where he died days later.
In the years in between 1849 and 1859, a skeleton was found on King William Island that was thought to be that of Harry Goodsir (28–29), who had disappeared in 1848. After conducting tests on the bones it is believed that cause of its death was a tooth that was infected, but this is not known for sure. Also a skeleton was found that was thought to be that of Henry Thomas Dundas Le Vesconte (25–26), who disappeared along with Goodsir, aboard Franklin's lost expedition, but this was proven to be untrue. Who it belonged to and death cause are unknown. Dundas Le Vesconte's body was found, but his death case is unknown.
 An explorer named Francis Leopold McClintock found a skeleton on King William Island on 25 May 1859. It was believed to be the remains of Harry Peglar (36), but this proved to be untrue and its identity and death cause are not known.
 Richard H. Barter (26), member of a stagecoach robbery gang active in California, was found dead outside Auburn on 12 July 1859. He had been ambushed and injured by law enforcement the day before, but it was unclear who had actually landed the fatal shot.
 Edward James Roye (57), was the first of Liberia's True Whig Party, who had served as the fifth President of Liberia from 1870 until he was overthrown a year later and whose death had followed on 11 February 1872. The cause of his death remains unknown.
 Zeng Guofan (60), a Chinese statesman, military general, and Confucian scholar of the late Qing dynasty. He is best known for raising and organizing the Xiang Army to aid the Qing military in suppressing the Taiping Rebellion and restoring the stability of the Qing Empire. Along with other prominent figures such as Zuo Zongtang and Li Hongzhang of his time, Zeng set the scene for the Tongzhi Restoration, an attempt to arrest the decline of the Qing dynasty. He died on 12 March 1872 of mysterious reasons.
 L'Inconnue de la Seine was the name given to an unidentified young woman who, according to an oft-repeated story, was pulled out of the River Seine at the Quai du Louvre in Paris around the late 1880s. Since the body showed no signs of violence, suicide was suspected.
 Colorado rancher Gottlieb Fluhmann (55), was last seen alive in 1892. His disappearance was not resolved until his bones were found in a secluded Park County cave in 1944; the cause of his death could not be determined.
 Pyotr Ilyich Tchaikovsky (53), who was the composer of a Sixth Symphony, called the "Pathétique", died in Saint Petersburg in November 1893 just nine days after it had debuted. His death cause is debated and remains unsolved.
 Barney Barnato (46), an English Randlord and entrepreneur who was a prominent rival to Cecil Rhodes, was found dead at sea near Madeira, Portugal on 14 June 1897. While suicide was the prevailing theory, his family rejected it, saying that it was unlike him to do such a thing.

1900–1924
 Sursinhji Takhtasinhji Gohil (26), popularly known by his pen name, Kalapi, was a Gujarati poet and the Thakor (prince) of Lathi state in Gujarat who died on 9 June 1900. He is mostly known for his poems depicting his own pathos. It is believed that Kalapi's love for a woman named Shobhana became a source of conflict with their acquaintance Rajba-Ramaba and gave her a motive to poison him.
 Gaetano Bresci (31), was an Italian anarchist who assassinated King Umberto I of Italy in Monza on 29 July 1900. Due to capital punishment being abolished 11 years earlier, he was sentenced to penal servitude at Santo Stefano Island, where he was found dead in his cell on 22 May 1901. While his death was reported as being suicide by hanging, it is believed that he had been murdered.
 David Park Barnitz (23), was a Harvard graduate and an American poet who died on 10 October 1901 from unclear circumstances, as there are conflicting ideas about how he died.
 Paul Rée (51), was a German philosopher, author, and physician who died on 28 October 1901 after he fell into the Charnadüra Gorge in the Swiss Alps near Celerina when he was hiking. It is unknown whether it was a suicide or an accident.
 Émile Zola (62), French author who died on 29 September 1902 from carbon monoxide poisoning that was caused by a sealed chimney. His enemies were blamed for his death, but were not proven to have been actually responsible. It is also possible that Zola committed suicide.
 In 1903 a skeleton was discovered in the Wichita Mountains in a gravesite that was thought to have been that of Sequoyah (72–73), who had disappeared in August 1843. This could not be proven to be true and the skeleton's identity and cause of death remain unknown.
 On 14 March 1911 in Ostend harbour a deceased body was found that resembled Cecil Grace (30), who was a pioneer aviator who disappeared on 22 December 1910 over the English Channel. The body could not be identified since it was too badly disfigured, and its identity and cause of death remain unknown.
 German inventor Rudolf Diesel (55), disappeared in the English Channel in 1913 and was found dead at sea 10 days later. His cause of death is debated.
 Tom Thomson (39), a Canadian artist who was active in the early 20th century. Though his career was short, he managed to produce around 400 oil sketches on small wood panels, as well as around 50 larger works on canvas. Thomson disappeared on 8 July 1917 and was found dead a few days later. It is unknown whether his death was murder or suicide.
 Samuel Liddell MacGregor Mathers (64), English magician and occultist who died of an unknown cause between 5–20 November 1918 in Paris. The manner of death is unknown as his death certificate lists no cause for his death. Even though Violet Firth claimed Mathers' death was the result of the Spanish influenza that occurred throughout 1918 and early 1919, the dearth of facts about Mathers' private life make it very difficult to determine what truly caused his death.
In 1919 smoked human bones were found in a fireplace near Cape Primetny, and were thought be those of Peter Tessem and Paul Knutsen, who disappeared in 1918 while aboard the ship Maud during an Arctic expedition. Who they belonged to and cause of death are unknown.

 Silent film actress Virginia Rappe (30), was found to have died of peritonitis due to a ruptured bladder on 9 September 1921. While this could have been the result of some of her ongoing health problems, such as cystitis, or complications from a recent abortion (illegal at the time), Maude Delmont, an acquaintance, told the San Francisco Police Department that silent film comedian Fatty Arbuckle had sexually assaulted Rappe during a Labor Day party in his suite at the St. Francis Hotel, another possible cause of the ruptured bladder. Arbuckle was charged with rape and involuntary manslaughter but was acquitted.
In July 1922 an expedition was conducted during which a skeleton was discovered on the mainland shore which is across from Dikson Island. It is thought to be either Peter Tessem or Paul Knutsen. Its death cause is not known for certain.
In 1923 an unidentified body on the grounds of an abandoned Jesuit church in Corrientes whose death might have been caused by stabbing was found. It was thought to have been that of Alejandro Carrascosas (22), who had disappeared a year earlier. The body was never identified and the cause of the deceased's death is not known.
 George Mallory (37), was an English mountaineer who after taking part in the first three British expeditions to Mount Everest disappeared on either 8 or 9 June 1924. On 1 May 1999, Mallory's mummified body was found, He suffered serious lower limb injuries and rope burns resulting from a fall and then likely died of exposure, but the exact cause, timing and circumstances of his death and that of his travelling companion Andrew Irvine (who was never found) are unknown.

1925–1949
 Rudolf Steiner (64), Austrian esotericist who developed anthroposophy and Waldorf education, died from illness on 30 March 1925, but the nature of the illness was never confirmed and remains controversial, with theories suggesting cancer or poisoning as the most probable causes.
 Ottavio Bottecchia (32), 1927, Italian cyclist, was found by the side of a road, covered with bruises and with a serious skull fracture. His undamaged bicycle was discovered propped against a nearby tree. Bottecchia was taken to a hospital, but died soon afterwards. An official inquiry concluded accidental death, but it was suggested he had run afoul of the powerful and growing National Fascist Party in Italy at the time.
 José Rosario Oviedo (42), a Cuban rumba dancer known as "Malanga", died in 1927. The exact circumstances under which he died have never been known for certain. One common account has it that he was murdered after a dance contest through broken glass hidden in his food, but no death certificate was ever filed and the location of his grave is unknown.
 Pyotr Wrangel (49), was a Russian officer who died on 25 April 1928 from reasons that have been debated as his family stated that they think that he was poisoned by the butler of his brother. This was never proven for certain though.
 Cecil Kern (41–45), female American theater director and stage and film actress who was reported to have died of a pulmonary hemorrhage on 1 June 1928 in a Manhattan hotel. The cause of her death is not known for certain.
 Alfred Loewenstein (51), was a Belgian financier who's believed to have fallen out of a plane's rear door while going to use the lavatory. He disappeared while crossing the North Sea on 4 July 1928, and his body was found in France 15 days later. His death cause is unknown.
 Starr Faithfull (25), a Greenwich Village flapper, was found drowned on the beach at Long Beach, Nassau County, New York on 8 June 1931. Although Faithfull had left a suicide note, her family contended that she was murdered by wealthy politician Andrew James Peters, former Mayor of Boston, who had allegedly sexually abused Faithfull for years beginning when she was 11 years old and paid the Faithfulls to keep silent about it. Despite a lengthy investigation, it was never determined whether Faithfull's death was homicide, suicide, or accident.
 Ivar Kreuger (52), a Swedish civil engineer, financier, entrepreneur and industrialist who died in a Paris hotel room on 12 March 1932. Though it was thought it have been a suicide it may have also have been a murder.
 Jay Ferdinand Towner III (23), a Princeton University undergraduate, was found dead on campus shortly after an 11 November 1933, football game. He had suffered broken wrists and severe internal injuries. His death was variously attributed to a fall suffered in the stands during the game or a car accident amid conflicting accounts of his whereabouts prior to his death; its exact cause has never been determined.

Zachary Smith Reynolds (20) was the son of American millionaire and businessman R. J. Reynolds. He died from a gunshot wound to the head on 6 July 1932, at his home in Winston-Salem, North Carolina. It is unclear if his death was a suicide or a murder.
Paul Bern (42), was an American film director, screenwriter from Wandsbek, Hamburg, Germany. He became the assistant to Irving Thalberg after he became the producer for Metro-Goldwyn-Mayer. He was found dead in Beverly Hills, California on 5 September 1932 after being shot. Even though he left a note saying that he committed suicide it is also believed that his former ex-common-law wife had killed him as she very shortly later herself committed suicide.
Ivo Pilar (59), was a Croatian lawyer, politician, publicist, and historian who was found dead on 3 September 1933 at his home in Zagreb, Kingdom of Yugoslavia and it is unknown whether he was killed or if it was a suicide.
Franziska Kessel (28), was a German politician who after being sent to jail in Mainz was found dead in her cell on 23 April 1934. It is unknown whether Kessel committed suicide was murdered.
 Thelma Todd (29), was an actress notable for appearing in multiple comedy films where she starred alongside Buster Keaton, Charley Chase, Laurel and Hardy and the Marx Brothers. On the morning of Monday, 16 December 1935, she was found dead in her car inside the garage of Jewel Carmen, a former actress and former wife of Todd's lover and business partner, Roland West. Her death was determined to have been caused by carbon monoxide poisoning. The exact circumstances of the case could not be determined and sparked wide speculations and theories. The case was officially closed as "accidental with possible suicide tendencies." It could never be determined and still sparks debate whether her death was accidental, suicide or murder.
In 1936 in Northampton, Massachusetts, human bones found in a shallow grave were believed to be those of Alice Corbett, who disappeared in 1925, but were identified as being those of historic Native American remains, but they remain unidentified and the cause of death is unknown.
 In the Requejada countryside dam which is located very close to Aguilar de Campoo, two bags were found that contained human bones that were thought to be missing girls from Spain who disappeared on 23 April 1992 in Reinosa, who were named Virginia Guerrero and Manuela Torres on 9 October 1994. This was later proven to be untrue and that they were from in between 1936 and 1939 and were unknown victims of the Spanish Civil War, and their identities and cause of death remain unknown.
 Robert Johnson (27), an early blues singer and guitarist, died on 16 August 1938, near Greenwood, Mississippi. The cause was not officially recorded. He was reportedly in extreme pain and suffering from convulsions; this has led to theories he had been poisoned with strychnine by a jealous husband; however, the alleged poisoning is said to have taken place several days earlier and most strychnine deaths take place within hours of ingestion. Another report claims he died of syphilis or pneumonia. The uncertain location of his gravesite has made it impossible to exhume his body for further investigation.
Eugeniusz Kazimirowski (63), was a Polish male member of the realism movement and a very accomplished painter died from unknown causes in the city of Białystok on 23 September 1939.
Kyrylo Studynsky (30–31), was a western Ukrainian cultural and political figure who was forced to leave Lviv in July 1941 and died shortly after from unknown reasons.
 Jeanette Loff (35), was an American actress, musician, and singer who came to prominence for her appearances in several Pathé Exchange and Universal Pictures films in the 1920s who died on 4 August 1942 from ammonia poisoning in Los Angeles. Though law enforcement was unable to determine whether her death was an accident or a suicide, Loff's family maintained that she had been murdered. The real cause behind her death remains unknown.
 Sidney Fox (34), was an American actress who acted both on stage and in movies. On 15 November 1942 Fox died in Hollywood from after taking too many sleeping pills, which was the result of either a suicide or an accidental overdose.
 Władysław Sikorski (62), prime minister of the Polish Government in exile, was among 16 people killed on 4 July 1943 when their plane crashed into the sea shortly after taking off from the Royal Air Force base at Gibraltar Airport. The plane had not managed to gain sufficient altitude due to its elevators being prevented from working properly; British investigators found the cause was most likely an accident while their Polish counterparts called it undetermined. The bodies of Sikorski's daughter, chief of staff and other key aides purportedly on the plane were never found, and the plane's only survivor, the pilot, had uncharacteristically worn his life preserver in the cockpit. Sabotage and a possible assassination have been suspected, with Nazi Germany, the Soviet Union, the United Kingdom, or even rival factions in the Polish government in exile theorized to have been involved. Poland reopened the case in 2008; an exhumation of Sikorski's body found his injuries consistent with death from an air crash, ruling out some theories that he had been killed before being put on the plane, but the investigators still could not rule out the possibility of sabotage. British files on the case will remain sealed until 2050.
 Emil Hácha (72), a Czech lawyer, the third President of Czechoslovakia from 1938 to 1939, who died in Pankrác Prison on 27 June 1945 under mysterious circumstances, and his death cause remains unknown. Hácha had collaborated with the Nazis during the German occupation, and had been arrested by the Red Army after the liberation of Prague.
 Lipót Klug (91), a Jewish-Hungarian mathematician, professor who died towards the end of the Second World War on 24 March 1945 in what were said to have been strange circumstances, his true cause of death having never been revealed.
 Viktors Eglītis (68), a Latvian art theorist and writer who died on 20 April 1945 in prison in Riga from unknown reasons.
 King Ananda Mahidol of Thailand (20), died of gunshot wounds, either the product of suicide, accident or assassination, on 9 June 1946. Mahidol's successor King Bhumibol Adulyadej, Prime Minister Pridi Banomyong, and the former Japanese intelligence officer Masanobu Tsuji have alternatively been accused of complicity.
 The Body in the cylinder refers to a male decedent discovered within a partially sealed steel cylinder on a derelict WWII bomb site in Liverpool, England. The discovery was made on 13 July 1945 and it is believed that the body had lain undiscovered for 60 years. Inquiries named a strong (but unconfirmed) candidate for the identity of the decedent; however, the cause of death and the reason for their presence in the cylinder remain a mystery.
 Alexander Alekhine (53), the fourth World Chess Champion, was found dead in a hotel room in Estoril, Portugal on 24 March 1946. Several causes of death have been proposed, but the two most likely are a heart attack or choking on a piece of meat which was found lodged in his throat in an autopsy. 
 Vera West. West was an American fashion designer and film costume designer, who worked for Universal Pictures. She was found dead in her swimming pool on 29 June 1947, having possibly committed suicide by drowning, although police were never able to ascertain the precise circumstances surrounding her death.
 The Trow Ghyll skeleton, discovered in a cave in rural north Yorkshire, England in 1947, remains unidentified. The death probably occurred in 1941; the fact that the body was discovered with a glass bottle of cyanide has led to speculation that it was someone connected with espionage.

 Jan Masaryk (61), 1948, son of Tomáš Garrigue Masaryk, Czech diplomat, politician and Foreign Minister of Czechoslovakia, was found dead in the courtyard of the Foreign Ministry below his bathroom window. The initial investigation concluded that he committed suicide by jumping out of the window, although many are convinced that he was pushed. A new investigation by the Czechoslovak government after the Velvet Revolution ruled his death a murder.
 Sadanori Shimoyama (47), 1948, first director of Japanese National Railways, was last seen leaving his official car to go into a department store on his way to work the morning of 5 July of that year. Others reported seeing him at various train stations, and walking along one line, that afternoon. His dismembered body was found at noon the next day on the Jōban Line. It had indisputably gotten that way as a result of being struck by a train, but the autopsy suggested he had died before being struck. That conclusion has been disputed, and whether his death was a suicide or murder remains undetermined.
 United States Consul General to Mandatory Palestine Thomas C. Wasson was shot on May 22, 1948, in Jerusalem.  He died the next day.
 Irwin Foster Hilliard (48), was Canadian political figure and lawyer in Ontario who was last seen on 23 November 1948 before going on a shopping trip. He was found dead on 22 December 1948 close to Lambton. His death cause is unknown
 Nora Gregor (47), whose full name was "Eleonora Hermina Gregor" was an Austrian actress who acted in both on stage and in movies who died on 20 January 1949 in Viña del Mar from a debated cause.

1950–1974
 In 1951 human bones were found and were thought to be the remains of Percy Fawcett (57), who had disappeared on 29 May 1925 in Mato Grosso, Brazil, This was proven to be untrue; they remain unidentified and the cause of death is unknown.
 Syama Prasad Mukherjee (52), an Indian politician, died in a prison hospital 23 June 1953, one and a half months after his arrest for attempting to enter Jammu and Kashmir without a permit. The exact cause of death has never been disclosed; Prime Minister Jawaharlal Nehru, whose government Mukherjee had resigned from in protest over Nehru's decision to normalise relations with Pakistan despite that country's treatment of its Hindu population, said at the time he made inquiries and was satisfied that his former minister's death was due to natural causes; speculation has continued that Mukherjee was actually murdered due to some unusual circumstances of his arrest and treatment.
 Raimondo Lanza di Trabia (39), was an Italian man who was successful in many fields. On 30 November 1954 in Rome, Lanza di Trabia died from circumstances that are suspicious after he fell out of a hotel room window.
Herman Schultheis (33), was a technician and photographer who worked for Walt Disney Studios  who disappeared on 20 May 1955 near Tikal, Guatemala. His remains were found on 23 November 1956, along with some of his belongings. His death cause is unknown.
 The Dyatlov Pass incident was the deaths of nine hikers on the Kholat Syakhl mountain in the northern Ural Mountains range on 2 February 1959; the bodies were not recovered until that May. While most of the victims were found to have died of hypothermia after apparently abandoning their tent high on an exposed mountainside, two had fractured skulls, two had broken ribs, and one was missing her tongue. There were no witnesses or survivors to provide any testimony, and the cause of death was listed as a "compelling natural force", most likely an avalanche, by Soviet investigators.

 Barthélemy Boganda (48), who was Prime Minister of the Central African Republic died on 29 March 1959 in Boukpayanga during a mysterious plane crash.
 Diana Barrymore (38), was an American actress who acted both on the stage and in movies and is a relative of American actress Drew Barrymore. On 25 January 1960, Diana Barrymore died in her hometown of New York City. At first her death was said to be the result of a drug overdose. After an autopsy was conducted, this was proven to be untrue. Speculation included a theory that she might have committed suicide, but this was never proven. She had admitted publicly she was a recovering alcoholic. In July 1957, she gave an American television interview to Mike Wallace in which she said [video available for online viewing], "At the moment, I don't drink. I hope to be able, one day, in perhaps the near future [or] the very distant future, to be able to drink like a normal human being. That may never be possible."
 Dag Hammarskjöld (56), a Swedish economist and diplomat who served as the second Secretary-General of the United Nations died on 18 September 1961 in Ndola, Northern Rhodesia in a mysterious plane crash.
 Lucas Samalenge (33), a Katangese and Congolese politician who died under suspicious circumstances on 19 November 1961 in Lubumbashi.
 Dr Gilbert Stanley Bogle (39), and Margaret Olive Chandler (29), were found dead, both partially undressed, near the banks of the Lane Cove River in Sydney, Australia, on 1 January 1963. Their bluish pallor and the presence of vomit and excrement led to a finding that they had been poisoned, but the coroner was unable to determine what the toxin was. It was suspected they had been murdered (possibly by Chandler's husband) although no suspect has ever been identified. A 2006 TV documentary suggested their deaths were not due to foul play but the result of hydrogen sulfide gas leaking from the river bed and reaching dangerously high concentrations in the low-lying depressions where their bodies were found.
 The death certificate of Dorothy Kilgallen (52), states that she died on 8 November 1965 from "acute ethanol and barbiturate intoxication / circumstances undetermined." She was famous throughout the United States as a syndicated newspaper columnist and radio / television personality, most notably as a regular panelist on the longest running game show in history at the time, CBS's What's My Line. The New York City medical examiner James Luke categorized the cause of death as "circumstances undetermined."
 Lal Bahadur Shastri (61), an Indian politician who was the second Prime Minister of India mysteriously died on 11 January 1966, just hours after signing the Tashkent Declaration. His death cause is disputed.
 The Lead Masks Case involves the death of two Brazilian electronic technicians, Manoel Pereira da Cruz and Miguel José Viana, whose bodies were discovered on 20 August 1966, in Niterói, Rio de Janeiro, Brazil. After an autopsy was performed the cause of death could not be proven since the organs were too badly decomposed.
 Alvar Larsson (13), was a Swedish boy who disappeared on 16 April 1967 while going for a walk. In November 1982, a human skull was found on a small island 6 km away that was identified as belonging to Larsson. The disappearance attracted a lot of media coverage at the time and many theories as to what happened have been put forward. Thomas Quick has confessed to the crime, but has since recanted all his confessions.
 John Frey, an Oakland, California, police officer, was fatally shot on the morning of 28 October 1967, during a traffic stop where he had pulled over Black Panther leader Huey P. Newton, who was wounded in the shootout and convicted of voluntary manslaughter the following year. The gun Newton purportedly used was never found, and following two hung juries after the conviction was overturned on appeal in 1970 the district attorney's office announced it would not try him a fourth time. Newton suggested that Frey may have been shot by his partner; there has been no new investigation to determine whether this was the case and whether this was an accident.
 Joan Robinson Hill (38), was a Texas socialite who died in 1969. At first ruled to have died of influenza following a brief hospitalization on 19 March, suspicions were aroused when her body was released to the funeral home and embalmed before a legally required autopsy could be carried out. Despite the compromised evidence, three autopsies, all with their own irregularities, were performed and her husband John eventually became the only person indicted by a Texas grand jury for murder by omission, or failing to take proper action in the face of a life-threatening situation. The first attempt to prosecute him ended in a mistrial in 1972; he was murdered before he could be retried and the gunman who was suspected of his murder died in a police shootout. Two other alleged accomplices were later convicted.
 Edward Mutesa (45), who was Kabaka of the Kingdom of Buganda in Uganda died on 21 November 1969 from alcohol poisoning, in his London flat. He may have committed suicide or been poisoned by someone.
 Katherine Walsh (23), American actress who died in London, England on 7 October 1970 while she was at a party at her home. While it is known that she died from barbiturate poisoning and alcohol, it is unknown whether is was a suicide or accident.
 Mustafa Zaidi (40), Pakistani Urdu poet from India who died in Karachi from unknown reasons on 12 October 1970. The case has never been solved.
 Ronald Hughes (35), an American attorney who disappeared while on a camping trip in November 1970. He had been representing Leslie Van Houten in the Tate–LaBianca murder trial. His body was found in March 1971, but his cause of death could not be determined.
 The Isdal Woman was a partially charred unidentified corpse found on 29 November 1970, hidden off a hiking trail near Bergen, Norway. The official conclusion that her death was a suicide has not been widely accepted, since some believed she was murdered. Her identity remains unknown and is considered one of Norway's most profound mysteries. The case has been the subject of intense speculation for many years. Multiple investigations point to the possibility that she was a spy.
Michael O'Sullivan (37), an American man who had a brief but successful acting career, was found dead at his apartment in San Francisco, California, on 24 July 1971 with a bottle of sleeping pills next to him from what may have been a death by suicide.
 Giangiacomo Feltrinelli (45), who had during the 1950s published the smuggled manuscript of Boris Pasternak's novel Doctor Zhivago, but later became a left-wing militant during Italy's Years of Lead, was found dead at the base of a power-line transmission tower outside Segrate, near his native Milan, on 15 March 1972. It was believed that he had died when a bomb he was attempting to plant on the tower went off, and later testimony by other members of the Red Brigades supported this. However, the death was always viewed suspiciously, and in the 2010s forensic reports surfaced that suggested he had been tied to the tower before the bomb went off, with various intelligence agencies inside and outside of Italy suspected of responsibility.
 Gia Scala (38), was American model and actress from Liverpool, Lancashire, England who on 30 April 1972 was found dead in her house that was in Hollywood Hills. Her cause of death remains undetermined.
 Nigel Green (47), was a character actor who was born in South Africa, and was raised in London, England, who died in Brighton, Sussex on 	15 May 1972 after taking too many sleeping pills. It is unknown if this was a suicide or not.
 Jeannette DePalma (16), was found dead and was believed to have been killed on or around 7 August 1972 in Springfield Township, New Jersey, but now her death is thought perhaps to have been caused by a drug overdose instead.
 Amaryllis Garnett was an English actress and diarist who appeared in various productions in the 1960s, with her most notable appearance being Judith of Balbec from the original 1966 version of A Choice of Kings. With the onset of the 1970s, however, she fell into a deep depression, and on 6 May 1973 she was found drowned in the Chelsea river. Whether her drowning was accidental or a suicide remains unclear.
 Kafundanga Chingunji, served as the first Chief of Staff in the government of UNITA, pro-Western rebels, during the Angolan Civil War. Officially, Chingunji died from cerebral malaria in January 1974 on Angola's border with Zambia. His wife and others who saw his body say someone poisoned Chingunji. Rumors later alleged Jonas Savimbi, the head of UNITA, ordered his assassination. It is unknown for sure what the exact circumstances of the death are.
 Karen Silkwood (28), a nuclear power whistleblower, died in a car accident on 13 November 1974, while driving to a meeting with a New York Times reporter in Oklahoma City. Whether that accident involved another vehicle, whose driver may have deliberately run her off the road, or resulted from her own fatigue, remains a matter of debate.
 Aman Andom (50), was an Ethiopian military figure and was the acting head of state of Ethiopia who died on 23 November 1974. Sources say that he committed suicide, while others say that he was killed by political rivals among the coup leadership, possibly including Mengistu Haile Mariam.

1975–1999
Marlies Hemmers (18) was a female German high school student who disappeared in Nordhorn on 6 August 1973 and whose remains were found on 22 December 1973 across from a horse breeding ground in a small wood. Since her body had decayed, it could not be determined what her cause of death was. It is believed she may have been murdered by the "Münsterland Killer".
 Alexandra "Sasha" Bell (29), a daughter of David K. E. Bruce, died under mysterious circumstances at her family home in Virginia in 1975. The cause of death may have been either murder or suicide.
Manon Dubé (10) was a Canadian girl from Quebec who vanished while sledding with friends in Massawippi on 27 January 1978. Her body was found on 24 March 1978, but the exact cause of death was never determined.
Marin Preda (57), was a Romanian director of Cartea Românească publishing house who wrote novels and about wars that had ended. Preda was found dead on 16 May 1980 at Mogoșoaia Palace from asphixiation, that had been caused from unknown reasons.
 Marcia Moore (50), a writer on yoga and astrology, disappeared near her home in the Seattle, Washington, area during the winter of 1979. Her skeletal remains were found in nearby woods in 1981. It has been presumed in the absence of any evidence that would more conclusively establish a cause of death that she died of hypothermia while wandering the woods under the influence of ketamine, a drug whose use she had promoted. However, true-crime writer Ann Rule, a friend, says what appeared to be a bullet hole was found in her jawbone, although authorities said it could just as easily have been a result of the bone decaying during the cold winters. Officially the cause of Moore's death remains undetermined.
 Douglas Crofut (38), American radiographer who died of both radiation poisoning and radiation burns on 27 July 1981 in Tulsa, Oklahoma. The event is thought to have been either a suicide or murder, but this remains uncertain.

 On 29 November 1981, actress Natalie Wood (43), who was a passenger on the yacht owned by her and her husband Robert Wagner, was found drowned near Santa Catalina Island, California. Two other people were on board the Wagners' yacht at the time: actor Christopher Walken and Dennis Davern, a longtime employee of the Wagners who served as skipper of the yacht. While drowning has always been accepted as the direct cause of her death, the circumstances under which she went into the water have never been clear, and after reopening the investigation in 2012 the coroner changed the cause of death from "accident" to "undetermined" based on cuts and bruises on her body that may or may not have been suffered before her death. In 2018, Wagner was identified as a person of interest.
 Don Kemp (34–35), was a New York advertising executive who disappeared under mysterious circumstances in Wyoming in 1982, where he had planned to begin a new life. His remains were discovered in 1986, but the circumstances surrounding his death, and whether it is homicidal in nature or not, remain unclear.
Milwaukee Jane Doe was an unknown female found dead on 16 March 1982. Her cause of death was a possible drowning and Her identity remains unknown.
 Eduardo Frei Montalva (71), who was president of Chile from 1964 to 1970, died on 22 January 1982. As of 2005, his death is being investigated because of allegations that he was poisoned.
 The cause of death of the baby born to Joanne Hayes in Ireland's 1984 Kerry Babies case was never established.
 Radomir Radović (32–33), a Yugoslav civil engineering technician and trade unionist who advocated for an independent trade union in the country, was found dead at his villa in Orašac on 30 April 1984. While the ruling party claimed that he had died by suicide, this claim was disputed by fellow intellectuals, and his true cause of death remains unclear.
 Kenji Iwamura, a 25-year old Japanese office worker purportedly died during the 1984–1990 SOS incident.
 The YOGTZE case refers to the death of unemployed German food engineer Günther Stoll (34), which occurred on 26 October 1984, under strange and largely unknown circumstances, after leaving behind the cryptic message "YOGTZE."
 Samora Machel (53), a Mozambican politician, military commander, and revolutionary was killed on 19 October 1986 during a mysterious plane crash that was close to the Mozambican-South African border.
 Cam Lyman (54–55), was a  multimillionaire dog breeder from Westwood, Massachusetts who disappeared in the summer of 1987 and his body was found in a septic tank on his estate in Hopkinton, Rhode Island by the new owners of the house in December 1997. Lyman's death remains a mystery.
 Fidel Figueroa, a well-known drug dealer and father of Lazaro Figueroa, was found deceased on 20 September 1987. His exact cause of death has never been determined, and the death is considered suspicious.
 On 11 October 1987, West German Christian Democratic Union politician Uwe Barschel (43) was found dead in a bathtub filled with water in his room at the Hotel Beau-Rivage in Geneva, Switzerland. He was fully clothed. Among others, the drug Lorazepam was found in his system. The circumstances of his death remain unclear and controversial, with suicide or murder both considered possible explanations and the case still being investigated in both directions.
 Whether the 17 August 1988 plane crash that killed Pakistani president Muhammad Zia-ul-Haq (64), the country's longest-serving leader, and 30 others including the country's top military leaders and the U.S. ambassador, was an accident or foul play, the result of sabotage or a shootdown, is a matter of debate. American investigators came to the former conclusion, while their Pakistani counterparts produced a report reaching the latter. Theories as to responsibility if it were an act of malice have put the blame on a number of domestic and foreign actors.
On 8 June 1989, Canadian nurse Cindy James (44) was found dead of a multiple-drug overdose in the yard of an abandoned house in the Vancouver suburb of Richmond, hogtied and with a nylon stocking around her neck. During the seven years leading up to her death, she had made approximately 100 reports to police of incidents of stalking, harassment, vandalism, and physical attacks. Despite significant investigation, authorities could find no evidence pointing to an assailant, and it was suspected that James had fabricated the incidents herself, culminating in an elaborate staged suicide. The cause of death was found to be a drug overdose due to the extraordinarily high levels of morphine, diazepam and other drugs found in her system, but exactly how that came about could not be determined.
 Said S. Bedair (40), was an Egyptian scientist in electrical, electronic and microwave engineering and a colonel in the Egyptian army. He died on 14 July 1989 in Alexandria of unclear circumstances, though his wife thinks it might have been a suicide.
 Berlin police were called to a Lichtenberg apartment on the night of 3 December 1991 after neighbors complained of loud arguments, barking dogs and a parade of men coming and going. Inside they found the body of Beate Ulbricht (47), adopted daughter of Walter Ulbricht, the first Communist leader of East Germany, by then defunct. Visible facial injuries suggested a death by blunt force trauma, but whether that had resulted from an accident or foul play has never been determined. She had recently given a series of interviews about her family life in which she recalled her mother, Lotte, as harsh and unloving, in contrast to her late father; Lotte was unsurprised when a reporter informed her of Beate's death. The unsolved stabbing death two years later of a man thought to be Beate's lover in her last years may be connected. 
 A skull fragment found in a wooded area of Baldwin, Pennsylvania in 1992 turned out to be that of Michael Rosenblum (25), of nearby Pittsburgh, who had not been seen since 14 February 1980, near where the bone was found. While the cause of death could not be determined, circumstantial evidence accumulated over the years suggested that Baldwin's police department had covered up its own officers' involvement in Rosenblum's disappearance; the chief was fired over the allegations and reinstated a short time later.
 The remains of Timothy Wiltsey (5), of South Amboy, New Jersey, were found in a muddy brook behind an office park in nearby Edison on 23 April 1992, almost a year after his mother, Michelle Lodzinski, had reported him missing from a carnival. Decomposition was too advanced to determine how Wiltsey had died. Suspicion accumulated around Lodzinski in later years owing to reports that she had changed her account of his disappearance several times shortly after reporting it, and her conviction for an attempt to stage her own kidnapping in 1994 followed by another conviction for theft several years later. In 2014 she was arrested for her son's murder and convicted after trial two years later, but the state Supreme Court vacated that conviction in 2021 for insufficient evidence. 
 Arnold Archambeau (20), and Ruby Bruguier (18), left a passenger behind in their overturned car following an accident before dawn on 12 December 1992 outside Lake Andes, South Dakota. They were never seen alive again; almost three months later their bodies were found near the accident site. Police do not believe they had been there during the intervening winter months as they were not found during several searches of the area. Autopsies attributed the deaths to hypothermia; however Bruguier's body was in a far more advanced stage of decomposition and other evidence at the scene has reinforced investigators' belief that the two died somewhere else and their bodies were moved there. The FBI investigated as well, due to the victims being Native Americans and the incident taking place on a reservation, but closed their file in 1999 having found insufficient evidence to believe a crime occurred.
The body of David Glenn Lewis (52), was found dead, the victim of a hit and run, on 1 February 1993, shortly after he was seen wandering on Washington State Route 24 in Moxee, Washington, just outside Yakima. At the time of his death he was wearing clothing his family said was not his. His body remained unidentified until 2004. The driver of the vehicle that struck him also remains unidentified, and since his presence in the Yakima area has not been explained, whether his death was an accident, suicide or foul play cannot be determined.
 Mansour Rashid El-Kikhia was a Libyan politician and human rights activist known for his opposition to Muammar Gaddafi's regime. On 10 December 1993, he was kidnapped while on a diplomatic visit to Cairo, Egypt, allegedly by Mukhabarat operatives. His fate remained unclear until October 2012, when his body was found in a refrigerator in Tripoli, indicating that he had likely died while in custody.
 Zviad Gamsakhurdia (54), former president of Georgia, died on 31 December 1993 from circumstances that remain very unclear. It is known that he died in the village of Khibula in the Samegrelo region of western Georgia.
On 27 April 1994, Lynne Frederick (39), was found dead by her mother in her West Los Angeles home. Foul play and suicide were ruled out and an autopsy failed to determine the cause of death. Some in the media speculated she died from the effects of alcoholism. Her remains were cremated at Golders Green Crematorium in London, and her ashes were interred with those of her first husband, Peter Sellers.
Sonja Engelbrecht (19), was a young teenage woman who went missing on the night of 1995 April 10–11 in Munich, whose remains were first discovered on 23 November 2021. Her cause of death remains unknown.
 Caroline Byrne (24), an Australian model, was found at the bottom of a cliff at The Gap in Sydney on 8 June 1995. Her boyfriend at the time of her death was charged with killing her and was convicted, but was acquitted of the conviction in February 2012 as the decision was overturned. It is unclear to whether her death is a murder or suicide.
 Carl Isaacs Jr. (21), formerly known Rock County John Doe, and also commonly referred as John Clinton Doe, was the name given to a now identified set of skeletal remains known to be a young adult white male, which were found alongside Turtle Creek near Clinton, Rock County, Wisconsin on 26 November 1995. His death cause is also unknown.
 Green Boots is the name given to the unidentified corpse of a climber that became a landmark on the main Northeast ridge route of Mount Everest. Though his identity has not been officially confirmed, he is believed to be Tsewang Paljor, an Indian climber who died on Mount Everest in 1996.
 English actor Barry Evans (53), died on 9 February 1997. The police went to his house to inform him that they had recovered his stolen car, which was reported the day before, but he was found dead in his home. The coroner found a blow to Evans's head and also found high levels of alcohol in his system. A short will was found on a table next to his body and a spilt packet of aspirin tablets, bearing a pre-decimalisation price tag, indicating that the pack was at least 26 years old, was found on the floor, although the coroner concluded that he had not taken any of them. The cause of his death was never confirmed.
 Screenwriter Gary DeVore (55), left Santa Fe, New Mexico, on 28 June 1997, for Hollywood to drop off his final draft of the script for a remake of The Big Steal, a 1950 film about, in part, a man who stages his own disappearance. He never arrived, and was considered missing for a year until his body was found in his car in the California Aqueduct. His hands were missing, and it did not appear from the position in which it was found that the car had gone into the waterway after an accident. No cause of death has been conclusively established.
 Ricky Reel (21), a computer science student at Brunel University. Reel was last seen alive in the early morning of 15 October; his body was recovered from the River Thames six days later. Although the Metropolitan Police initially declared his death accidental, an open verdict was later returned. Speculation remains as to a racial motive behind his death.
 Theodore Sindikubwabo, interim president during the Rwanda genocide, died in 1998. Cause of death is unknown, but it has been speculated that he died of HIV or was killed by Interahamwe hardliners.
 Patricia Lee Partin, who was among four women who left Los Angeles, California, and disappeared alongside Florinda Donner in 1998; her remains were found in the desert sands of Death Valley in 2003. Partin's cause of death remains unknown.
Skeletal remains of both a female and male were discovered in 1998 on the mountain known as Webb Hill located in St. George, Utah, in Washington County. Their identies and cause of deaths are unknown.
 Pol Pot, Cambodian war criminal who died in April 1998, shortly before his extradition on charges against humanity, died in custody; the official cause was a heart attack, but other reports hold that he committed suicide with drugs or was assassinated by General Ta Mok.
 Greek philosopher Dimitris Liantinis (55) disappeared on 1 June 1998. In July 2005 human bones were found in the area of the mountain Taygetos; forensic examinations verified that it was the body of Liantinis. No lethal substances were found to identify the cause of death.
 Sani Abacha (54), military dictator of Nigeria, who died on 8 June 1998. There is a popular theory in Nigeria that he died after consuming a poisoned apple, but one of his confidants reported that after Arafat's visit and shaking hands with the and his men began to feel bad and died shortly after.
 Kevin Hjalmarsson (4), Swedish boy who after going missing was found dead in Arvika on 16 August 1998. Though he was originally thought to have been murdered, it is now claimed by the police that he is thought to have died of an unknown accident.
Bardhyl Çaushi (62–63), an Kosovo Albanian activist and a human rights lawyer who was kidnapped in 1999 by Yugoslav forces and found dead in 2005 from reasons that could not be determened.
 Yves Godard (43), was a French doctor who disappeared from a sailing boat with his two children in September 1999. In 2000, a skull fragment belonging to his daughter Camille was found while some bone fragments of Dr Godard were discovered six years later in the English Channel. No trace of his son or his wife (the latter did not go on the sailing trip and stayed at home) has ever been found, nor has any trace of the boat. However, investigators found traces of blood in the family home and in Godard's caravan, raising suspicion that Godard's wife was murdered. In 2012, the case was closed without charges. Prosecutors ruled out accidental death and believe that Dr Godard probably murdered his family before committing suicide at sea, but they also acknowledge that they are not certain of this.
 Hangthong Thammawattana (49), a Thai businessman and politician who was found dead in the early hours of 6 September 1999 in his family's mansion. from a gunshot wound. It is unknown if it was a suicide or murder.
 Jaryd Atadero (3), was an American boy who went missing on 2 October 1999 in Colorado in the Arapaho & Roosevelt National Forest. On 6 May 2003 some of his remains were discovered by two businessmen while they were hiking. Though there are different theories to how he died, the true cause is not known.
 Jorge Matute (23), was a Chilean forestry student who mysteriously disappeared in a discotheque that was located close to Concepción on 20 November 1999. In February 2004 in a road in Santa Juana, Matute's remains were found and identified. Matute's cause of death is unknown.

2000–2010
 Lolo Ferrari (37), was a French dancer, singer and film actress who also performed in pornography and was known for her large surgically enhanced breasts. Ferrari was found deceased on the morning of 5 March 2000 of causes which have never been determined.
Erin Foster (18), and Jeremy Bechtel (17), were a teenage couple from Sparta, Tennessee who disappeared on 3 April 2000, after leaving a party. In 2021, they were both found dead in a car underwater. What led up to the event is unknown.
 Rodney Marks (32), an Australian astrophysicist, died of a sudden illness on 12 May 2000 at Amundsen–Scott South Pole Station in Antarctica. It was not possible for his body to be flown to New Zealand and autopsied until after the Antarctic winter ended six months later; the cause of death was found to have been methanol poisoning. Suicide was ruled out, as he did not seem to have a motive and had readily sought treatment for his apparent illness, nor did an accidental overdose seem likely, either, as there was plenty of alcoholic drink available for consumption at the base should he have wanted it. The New Zealand police believed instead that the methanol had been "unknowingly" introduced into Marks' system but could not conclusively call the case a homicide. Further investigation has been frustrated by the refusal of American agencies to share their findings, the global dispersal of researchers and personnel at the base that winter, the 2006 disappearance of the doctor who treated Marks, and the loss of any possible crime-scene evidence during the winter after Marks' death.
A human skeleton was found on 21 May 2000 near the river Otra, near Eg Hospital, while there was a search conducted to find Lena Sløgedal Paulsen (10), and  Stine Sofie Austegard Sørstrønen (8), who had disappeared on 19 May 2000. At first it was thought to be that of a missing German tourist, not being involved with the girl's disappearance. Though it was later discovered that the body was in fact that of a German psychiatric patient who had escaped from the psychiatric hospital that was located nearby years before. The cause of the patient's death is unknown.
 Soad Hosny (58), was an actress from Cairo, Egypt, who died in London after she mysteriously fell from the balcony of her friend's apartment on 21 June 2001.
 On 11 August 2001, Irish musician Paul Cunniffe (40), formerly of the bands Blaze X and the Saw Doctors, died in a fall in the London neighborhood of Whitechapel. The circumstances that led to the fall, however, or even exactly where it occurred, remain unknown. His is one of several deaths among friends and acquaintances of Pete Doherty.

 Tempe Girl is the name given to an unidentified decedent whose body was discovered on 27 April 2002 in Tempe, Arizona. She had died of cocaine intoxication – ruled to be neither an accident nor a homicide – one day before the discovery of her body. She is believed to have been of either Hispanic or Native American ethnicity and was allegedly picked up while hitchhiking, claiming she had been effectively disowned by her own mother for her frequent recreational drug use.
 Abu Nidal (65), Palestinian terrorist leader behind the 1985 Rome and Vienna airport attacks, already suffering from leukemia, was reported to have died from a gunshot wound in Baghdad on 16 August 2002. Iraq's government at the time claimed his death was a suicide; the Fatah Revolutionary Council Nidal founded claimed he was assassinated on Saddam Hussein's orders to prevent his possible capture during the American invasion of Iraq that began six months later.
 Jeremiah Duggan (22), a British student studying in Paris, was found dead on a highway in Wiesbaden, Germany, early on 27 March 2003. The initial investigation concluded he had committed suicide by running into traffic. However, his mother, noting that he had called her in great distress over his involvement with the LaRouche movement, who may have discovered that he was British and Jewish, within an hour of his death, never accepted that theory, and a later investigation found evidence that the accident may have been staged to cover an earlier beating. The case was reopened in 2012 after extensive litigation in England, resulting in a change of the cause of death to "unexplained", with the note that Duggan may have been involved in some sort of "altercation" beforehand.

A human skull that was found off Vanikoro in April 2003 was thought to been that of Gaspard Duché de Vancy (35–36), who disappeared in 1788. Who it belonged to and death cause, are unknown.
 Jürgen Möllemann (57), German Free Democratic Party politician, died on 5 June 2003 in a parachuting incident at Marl-Lohmühle. His death was investigated by the Essen district attorney's office, which published a final report on 9 July 2003. While outside interference was ruled out, no definite verdict was reached on whether Möllemann committed suicide or had died via misadventure. Shortly before his death, Möllemann, a passionate and experienced skydiver, had been confronted with allegations he had been involved in illegal arms deals and evaded taxes on millions of euros he allegedly earned from these activities. To enable a full investigation on these charges, the Bundestag lifted his parliamentary immunity on 5 June 2003 at 12:28, 22 minutes before his death. The tax evasion charges were dropped after his death.
 Singer-songwriter Elliott Smith (34), died of stab wounds inflicted in his Los Angeles home on 21 October 2003. His girlfriend claims she got out of the shower after an argument, having heard him scream, to find him with the knife sticking out of his chest, and found a short suicide note on a Post-It shortly thereafter. While he did indeed have a history of depression and drug addiction, friends say he was actively working to finish an album at the time and seemed optimistic. The coroner found the stab wounds were inconsistent with a suicide attempt but could not say it was a homicide either; the cause of the stabbing remains undetermined and has not been further investigated.
 Jonathan Luna (38), an Assistant U.S. Attorney from Baltimore, was found dead of multiple stab wounds inflicted with his own penknife in Denver, Pennsylvania, on the morning of 4 December 2003 in a stream underneath his car, which had been driven there overnight from Baltimore. The FBI, which has jurisdiction over the possible murder of any U.S. federal employee, found that Luna had mounting financial problems and was facing an investigation over missing money at his office; they considered it a suicide or botched attempt at staging a kidnapping. However, the Lancaster County coroner's office, pointing to evidence suggesting he had been abducted and someone else was driving for at least the final stage of his drive, ruled it a homicide and considers the case open.
 Lamduan Armitage was a formerly unidentified woman whose body was discovered in 2004 on the mountain Pen-y-ghent in Yorkshire, England, leading her to become known as the Lady of the Hills. The woman was found to have originally come from somewhere in South-East Asia, but despite an international police investigation, the identity of the woman, and how she arrived at the location remained a mystery until 2019. The woman was identified in March 2019 through DNA testing. Her cause of death remains unknown.
 Alonzo Brooks (23), American man who went missing from La Cygne, Kansas, on 3 April 2004 and was found dead on 1 May 2004. After the pathologists did an autopsy they have not yet been able to tell the cause of his death.
 The coroner investigating the death of Richard Lancelyn Green (51), a British Arthur Conan Doyle scholar who was found garrotted with a shoelace on his bed in his home on 27 April 2004, returned an open verdict. Many of his friends and family suspected homicide as he had complained of someone following him in his efforts to stop the auction of a cache of Doyle's personal papers that he believed to have been wrongfully acquired. However, despite suicide by garrotte being unusual and difficult, some investigators believed that he had followed the example of one of Doyle's Sherlock Holmes stories in which a woman stages her suicide to look like a murder.
 John Garang (60), Sudanese politician and former rebel revolutionary leader, died on 30 July 2005 in New Cush, Sudan in a suspicious helicopter crash.
 Barbara Precht's (69) body was found on 29 November 2006 in Cincinnati, Ohio. She remained unidentified until November 2014. Her husband was later located and is considered a person of interest in her death, which has unknown circumstances.
 Joyce Carol Vincent (38), was found dead in her London flat in January 2006, two years after she had died, by which time the body had decomposed so much as to make identifying a cause of death impossible; her story was profiled in the 2011 documentary Dreams of a Life.
 Rey Rivera (32), American writer who was working for Stansberry and Associates who went missing from his house on 16 May 2006 and was found dead on Belvedere Hotel on 24 May 2006, in Mount Vernon, Baltimore Even though the Baltimore Police Department has claimed that his death was most likely to be a suicide, this has not been proven to be the case.
 Bob Woolmer (58), Pakistan's national cricket coach, was found dead in his hotel room on 18 March 2007, after losing in the Cricket World Cup 2007 in the West Indies. Investigators at first ruled the death a suicide, but the jury that heard the inquest returned an open verdict.
 Three years after the body of Corryn Rayney (44), was found in the Perth suburb of Kings Park, Western Australia a week after her 7 August 2007 disappearance, her husband Lloyd was charged in her murder even though a cause of death had not been determined. A judge acquitted him at his 2012 trial, finding the largely circumstantial case was further compromised by police misconduct. The verdict was upheld on appeal the following year; Rayney and his lawyers have called for two known sex criminals to be investigated as well.
 The Salish Sea human foot discoveries are the severed feet found from 20 August 2007 to 1 January 2019 that are known to belong to people who are thought to be dead. The circumstances behind these events remain unclear.
 Tony Harris (36), American basketball player who had played in multiple countries disappeared from Brasília, Brazil on 4 November 2007 and was found dead on 18 November 2007. There are different ideas about why he died, yet the true cause of his death is unknown.
 Two-year-old Caylee Anthony, of Orlando, Florida, was reported missing by her grandmother in the summer of 2008, when she learned that her daughter Casey had not seen her in over a month. Casey claimed the girl had been kidnapped by a nanny and circumstantial evidence led to her arrest on murder charges that fall. A tip that could have led to the body's discovery in August was not fully acted upon until December; by then the body was so decomposed that it was impossible to establish how Caylee had died, although the coroner ruled it homicide. Casey Anthony, despite public sentiment strongly against her, was acquitted of the murder and child-abuse charges (but convicted of the lesser charges of lying to the police) after a heavily covered trial in 2011, where her lawyer claimed that Caylee had accidentally drowned in the family pool and Casey's domineering father had led a cover-up. Later, her father came forward with his own explanation: Casey had allegedly been known to drug Caylee to entice her to sleep so Casey could leave Caylee home alone and go out with friends for the evening. He alleges Casey or a friend accidentally overdosed Caylee, killing her, and in a panic, made up the kidnapping story as a cover.
 Missing list of suspects in the 2008 Noida double murder case.
 American professional wrestler Steven James Bisson (32), who went by the ring name of "Steve Bradley", was found dead on 4 December 2008 in Manchester, New Hampshire, in a parking lot across the street from a pro wrestling school where he once operated. Bradley's cause of death is undetermined, as the autopsy could not reveal what he died from, so his death remains a mystery.
 The Peter Bergmann case is an unsolved mystery pertaining to the death of an unidentified man in County Sligo, Ireland, whose naked body was found on a beach; the autopsy found no signs of drowning or foul play and thus the cause of death remains undetermined. From 12 to 16 June 2009, a man using the alias "Peter Bergmann" visited the coastal seaport town of Sligo in northwest Ireland. He used this alias to check into the Sligo City Hotel, where he stayed during the majority of his visit. He was described by hotel staff and tenants as having a heavy German accent. Despite conducting a five-month investigation into the death of "Peter Bergmann", the Garda Síochána have never been able to identify the man or develop any leads in the case.
 Skeletal remains found in a dry creek bed in California's Malibu Canyon on 9 August 2010, turned out to be those of Mitrice Richardson (25). She had last been seen on the night of 16 September 2009 in the backyard of a former local television news anchor after being arrested for marijuana possession and failure to pay the bill at a local restaurant where she had been acting strangely, behavior that investigating officers did not believe was caused by alcohol or drugs. The coroner has said her death did not appear to be a homicide, but the body was too decayed to determine the exact cause of death.
The Jamison family disappeared mysteriously on 8 October 2009 from Red Oak, Oklahoma and were all later found dead after four years in November 2013. Their death causes could not be determined.

2010–2019
 On 23 August 2010, the partially decomposed body of Gareth Williams (32), a Welsh mathematician who worked for British intelligence GCHQ, but who was seconded to MI6 at the time of his death, was found in a padlocked bag in the bathroom of a safe house in the London neighbourhood of Pimlico. It was determined he had been dead for about a week. Due to the nature of his work, the investigation had to withhold details of it and some other aspects from any material made public; his family and friends allege that the Metropolitan Police compromised and mishandled key forensic evidence in the early stages of their response. An initial investigation by the coroner's office concluded that the death was a homicide; a later re-investigation by the police claimed that it was instead an accident.
 Rajiv Dixit (43), an Indian public speaker and social activist who died on 30 November 2010 in Bhilai, Chhattisgarh, after his meal was poisoned. It is claimed that Dixit refused to undergo emergency medical treatment, as he did not trust Allopathic medicine, and died shortly thereafter. No autopsy was ever conducted so it remains unknown whether Dixit was deliberately poisoned, committed suicide, or if a person or persons covered up the truth.
Anneka Di Lorenzo (58), was a film star and a nude model who worked in California who was found dead in January 2011 after having drowned in the sea off Camp Pendleton. It is unknown whether or not her death was either a murder or suicide.
 British citizen Lee Bradley Brown (39), was arrested by Dubai police while on holiday there 6 April 2011 and charged with assault after an incident between him and a hotel maid; accounts of the circumstances differ. Held without bail, he died in custody six days later after, police claimed, being beaten by cellmates; later they said he had "thrown himself on the ground repeatedly." An autopsy, however, found instead that Brown had, under the influence of hashish, choked on his own vomit. British officials who were allowed to examine the body disputed that conclusion, saying they saw no evidence of choking or blunt force trauma; Dubai authorities have declined repeated requests to share evidence such as CCTV footage from the original incident and the police station that might clarify matters. A coroner's inquest in the UK that considered only the autopsy report and the diplomats' reports returned an open verdict.
 Tom J. Anderson (35), formerly known by his birth name "Ahmad Rezaee", was a businessman and the eldest son of Iranian Major General Mohsen Rezaee. On 12 November 2011, he was found dead in the Gloria Hotel, located in Dubai Media City, where he was staying. There are different theories about how he died, yet the cause of his death remains unknown.
 Stephen Corrigan (48), an Irish man who disappeared on 22 November 2011, and on 9 April 2020 some remains of his skeleton were found in Rathmines, Dublin. Corrigan's death cause is unknown.
 Candice Cohen-Ahnine (35), a French Jewish woman who successfully fought a legal battle against Saudi prince Sattam bin Khalid Al Saud over their illegitimate daughter, fell to her death in Paris on August 16, 2012. Her death is considered suspicious in nature due to the circumstances.
 Exiled Russian oligarch Boris Berezovsky (67), was found dead in his home near Ascot, Berkshire on 23 March 2013. At first glance he had hanged himself; he had recently lost what remained of his fortune, and some other close friends had unexpectedly died, which had left him despondent. The police soon ruled the case a suicide, but at the inquest, Berezovsky's daughter, who believes her father was murdered at the behest of the Russian government, introduced a report by a German pathologist that cast enough doubt for the coroner to return an open verdict.
 Zsolt Erőss (45), a Hungarian high-altitude mountaineer, disappeared on 21 May 2013 while he was climbing Kangchenjunga. Erőss' body was found in 2014, and his death cause is unknown.
 A worker at a Fenton, Missouri, senior living facility found the body of Shirley Rae Neumann (78), on the grounds outside the facility on the afternoon of October 31, 2013. At first it appeared that Neumann, who suffered from advanced arthritis and dementia, had fallen from the balcony of her apartment, since its railing had been broken, and the county coroner ruled the death accidental. But tests also found a level of the sedative Zolpidem in her blood that was eight times higher than a normal dose would have left. The last person to see Neumann alive was her daughter, Pam Hupp. Hupp stood to benefit financially from her mother's death, and she told staff that her mother would not be leaving her apartment the next day . Hupp had also pleaded guilty to another murder that prosecutors alleged she had committed to point suspicion at the husband of a murdered friend of Hupp's who had been acquitted at a retrial after spending several years in prison, a murder in which Hupp herself has been implicated as the real killer. After these events, a new coroner changed the finding to undetermined.
 On 15–16 November 2013, the skeletal remains of two adults and one child were found in a field outside Red Oak, Oklahoma. A year later they were identified as the Jamison family, who had gone missing in 2009 while looking into some land they wanted to purchase. Their abandoned pickup truck was three miles (4.8 km) from where their bodies were found. No cause of death has been determined.
 The decomposing remains of Canadian journalist Dave Walker (57), were found in Cambodia's Angkor temple complex on 1 May 2014, ending a search that began shortly after he failed to return to his hotel's guest house on the night of 14 February. While the medical examiner concluded that he had died weeks earlier, the cause of Walker's death could not be determined.
 Bone fragments found along the Rio Culebra near Boquete, Panama, in late June 2014 were matched to Lisanne Froon, 22, and Kris Kremers, 21, of Amersfoort, the Netherlands. The two had last been seen alive on 1 April when they went for a hike on the popular El Pianista trail. After unsuccessful initial searches a backpack belonging to the women was turned in by a local. It contained their phones, a Canon camera and personal effects. After two months small fraction of their remains was found as well. The women's cell phones showed that they had repeatedly attempted to contact emergency numbers shortly after taking pictures of themselves at the Continental Divide. Those calls had continued over several days, and Froon's camera contained 90 photographs taken in the night of 8 April, seven days after their disappearance. Most of the photos showed the jungle in the dark, but some of them contained rock formations, and small pieces of paper and other items in close-up and one contained the back of Kremers's head. It was impossible to determine from the remains that were found exactly how they had died. Local officials believe the women suffered an accidental injury shortly after getting lost in a network of trails in the region's cloud forests and got lost in the wilderness around Volcán Barú; however, Panamanian lawyers for their families have pointed to failings of the investigation and suggested both women could have met with foul play.
 On 27 June 2014, the body of Andrew Sadek (20), was recovered from the Red River near Breckenridge, Minnesota, with a small-caliber gunshot wound and a backpack full of rocks. He had last been seen by a security camera leaving his dorm at North Dakota State College of Science in Wahpeton around 2 a.m. on 1 May. At the time of his disappearance he had been working as a confidential informant for local police as a result of his own arrest for selling marijuana on campus, which could otherwise have resulted in a long prison sentence. It has not been determined yet whether his death was suicide or murder. Like Rachel Hoffman's death, the case has been used as an example of the mishandling of youthful CIs by police.
 Gennadiy Tsypkalov (43), was a political and military figure of the unrecognized Luhansk People's Republic (LPR). According to officials of the Luhansk People's Republic, Tsypkalov had committed suicide on 17 May 2014, yet according to some of Tsypkalov's colleagues whom Igor Plotnitsky dismissed, the leadership of LPR murdered Tsypkalov. His true death cause is unknown.
 Lennon Lacy was a student who went to West Bladen High School located in Bladenboro, North Carolina who was found dead in the center of a mobile home community hanging from the frame of a swing set on 29 August 2014. It is unclear whether he committed suicide or was murdered.
 John Sheridan (72), formerly New Jersey's Transportation Commissioner, was found dead in his Skillman home along with his wife Joyce on the morning of 28 September 2014. The bodies were in an upstairs bedroom where a fire had been set; they were found with multiple stab wounds. An original ruling of murder-suicide was changed to undetermined in 2017 after a court challenge by the couple's sons, motivated by complaints of mishandled evidence and some evidence suggesting the couple had been attacked by an intruder. The sons called for the investigation to be reopened, which the state attorney general did in 2022.
 The Unnao dead bodies row are the discovery on 14 January 2015 of over one hundred dead bodies who were found floating in the River Ganges in Unnao district located in the Indian state of Uttar Pradesh who are unidentified. The cause behind their deaths are unknown.
 Alberto Nisman (51), an Argentine federal prosecutor, was found dead in his apartment of a single gunshot wound to the head on 18 January 2015. He had been investigating the 1994 AMIA bombing, Argentina's deadliest terror attack, and had publicly accused President Cristina Kirchner and other high officials close to her of covering up for suspects in the case for foreign-policy reasons; he was scheduled to present these allegations to Congress the next day. While some of the circumstances of his death are consistent with an early statement that he committed suicide, friends and relatives say that he was eagerly looking ahead to his appearance before Congress and did not seem depressed or despondent at all. Kirchner has suggested the country's intelligence services were behind the killing, since he was about to expose their attempts to bring her down, and called for them to be dismantled. The case remains under investigation.
 Canserbero (26), a Venezuelan hip hop artist and songwriter, was found dead from an apparent fall in front of his apartment complex in Maracay on January 20, 2015. Several hypotheses have been proposed as to what led to his death.
 Kayla Mueller (26), an American human rights activist and humanitarian aid worker who had been taken captive by the Islamic State in August 2013 in Aleppo, Syria, where she was helping Doctors Without Borders, was reported to have died in a Jordanian air strike during the Syrian Civil War in Raqqa on 6 February 2015. Her death was confirmed by the Pentagon, but the circumstances could not be established by the US. The Pentagon agreed the building she supposedly died in according to ISIS was hit in the bombings, but disputed that Mueller or any other civilian had been inside at the time. The site had been bombed by the coalition twice before, and was targeted again because ISIS soldiers sometimes return to bombed sites, thinking the coalition would not bomb those sites again, according to Pentagon spokesman John Kirby. After Abu Bakr al-Baghdadi's death in October 2019, new speculations arose that Al-Baghdadi may have had her executed.
 On 22 April 2015, the body of Ambrose Ball (30), of London, was recovered from the River Lea in Tottenham. He had last been seen leaving his vehicle following a single-car accident early on the morning of 24 January after visiting a local pub with friends. The body was too decomposed to determine a cause of death; police requested an adjournment of the inquest in order to further investigate, implying a murder charge was in the works. No charges were ever filed, and threats were later made against Ball's friends and family after they set up a Facebook page appealing for help from the public and questioning the conduct of the investigation.
 On 8 February 2016, an unidentified bus driver was purportedly killed by a falling meteorite in Tamil Nadu, India. If the object truly was a meteorite, then it would be first human fatality from such a type of death in recorded history.
 On 10 December 2016, human remains were discovered in Charlestown, Rhode Island that were thought to be those of mobster Danny Walsh (43). The remains were found where he once had lived. This was later proved false, and the person to whom they belonged to and identity and death cause are unknown.
 Vladimir Cvijan, Serbian lawyer and politician, former MP (2012–2014) and legal advisor and General Secretary of President of Serbia (2004–2010). High-ranked member of ruling SNS of Aleksandar Vučić, from 2010 to 2014, and later dissident. He disappeared in 2017, allegedly fleeing to the United States, however, in March 2021 Serbian media published a document in which the Public Prosecutor of the Higher Public Prosecutors Office in Belgrade states that the Prosecutor's Office issued an order ordering the payment of costs to the Institute for Forensic Medicine of the Faculty of Medicine, University of Belgrade for the autopsy of Vladimir Cvijan's body on 20 November 2018 in Belgrade, Serbia. The cause, circumstances and exact date of his death are still unknown.

 Valery Bolotov (46), was a Ukrainian militant leader known for his involvement in the Donbass War in eastern Ukraine, and as the leader of the unrecognized Luhansk People's Republic. Bolotov was found dead on 27 January 2017 in his own home in Moscow, Russia. The preliminary results of clinical tests showed an acute heart failure as reason for death. Poisoning later was suspected. The causes of his death are currently being investigated and are not currently known.
 Otto Warmbier (22), was an American college student who was arrested and detained in North Korea since January 2016, on charges that he had attempted to steal a propaganda poster. During his imprisonment, he suffered an unspecified injury which caused him to go into a coma, from which he died on 19 June 2017.
 Rogelio Martinez (36), an agent of the United States Border Patrol died on 19 November 2017 in Culberson County, Texas while on duty. His cause of death is thought to be murder, but this remains uncertain owing to a lack of evidence. A four-month investigation was conducted by the FBI into his death cause, but the results were inconclusive.
 Computer hacker Adrian Lamo (37), was found dead 14 March 2018 on a pile of sheets in the guest bedroom of the Wichita, Kansas, home of a couple he had been living with. After three months of investigating, the county coroner was unable to identify a cause of death. While there are some alternative theories suggesting his death had something to do with his controversial involvement in the criminal cases against Chelsea Manning and Julian Assange, the most likely theory is the possible adverse interactions of some of the medicines found near him with kratom, which he often used.
 Hong Kong teenager Chan Yin-lam, who participated in the 2019 Hong Kong protests, was found dead and naked in the harbour off Tseung Kwan O on 22 September 2019. This sparked conspiracy theories in pro-protest circles, notably the online platform LIHKG that Chan had been killed by the police. On 11 September 2020, a coroner's inquest jury ruled that the cause of death could not be determined.
Yolanda Klug (26), German woman who disappeared in Leipzig on 25 September 2019 and whose disappearance has been linked to Scientology. A walker discovered her bones on 25 February 2023 in the "Rödel" forest area near Freyburg. The cause of death is unclear.
 Marc Bennett (52), a British citizen working for Qatar Airways, was found hanged in his Doha hotel room on 24 December 2019. Authorities there ruled it suicide, a finding Bennett's friend and family disputed as he had been actively making plans for his future at a new job with a Saudi company. The airline might have been upset by this since Qatar and Saudi Arabia do not have good relations; a couple of months earlier, after he had let them know that he was leaving, dissatisfied, he was arrested and charged with possessing stealing documents from the company. During the month he was held he said he was tortured. The West Sussex Coroner's Office reinvestigated the death and found that foul play "could not be ruled out".

2020s
 Ana Lucrecia Taglioretti (24), was a blind female Paraguayan violinist and prodigy who had performed at events for charitable causes. She was found dead on 9 January 2020 in her apartment in Asunción, Paraguay, by her mother during a welfare check. Her cause of death is unknown.
 Facundo Astudillo Castro (22–23), was an Argentine man who disappeared on 30 April 2020 during the COVID-19 pandemic after he was stopped by the police in Mayor Buratovich, Buenos Aires. Castro was found dead on 15 August 2020. Though Castro's death was revealed to be caused by drowning, it could not be determined if it was a result of homicide, suicide, or an accident.
 Esther Dingley (37), was an English hiker and blogger while going on a solo trip through the Pyrenees. Partial remains were found in July 2021, and later confirmed to be Dingley's following a DNA examination. Her cause of death is currently unknown.
 John Snorri Sigurjónsson (48), Juan Pablo Mohr Prieto (37), and Ali Sadpara (45), three high-altitude mountaineers, went missing while climbing the Bottleneck area of Pakistan's K2 mountain on 5 February 2021. The three men's bodies were found on 26 July of that year, but cause of death could not be determined.
 Melissa Caddick (49), was an Australian financial advisor who vanished on 12 November 2020, amid allegations that she was running a Ponzi scheme. Her partial remains were found floating in the ocean in February 2021, but cause of death is yet to be established.
 James Dean (35), English footballer and champion kickboxer who disappeared in the area of Oswaldtwistle on 5 May 2021. His body was found four days later. While authorities have said that the case is not treated as a homicide, no cause of death has been determined. The police announced his death was not being treated as suspicious.
 Kristina Đukić (21), was a Serbian livestreamer and YouTuber who was found dead in Belgrade, Serbia on 8 December 2021 from causes that have yet to be determined.
 Leah Croucher (19), British teenager was reported missing on 15 February 2019 in Milton Keynes, Buckinghamshire, England. She was confirmed deceased on 21 October 2022 following the official identification of her remains. The prime suspect in her death is convicted sex offender Neil Maxwell, who was found dead two months after Croucher's disappearance.
Nicola Bulley (45), disappeared from St Michael's on Wyre, Lancashire, England, while she was walking her dog. Bulley was found dead on 19 February 2023. Her death cause is unknown.

Date of death disputed
 Raoul Wallenberg (34), a Swedish humanitarian who worked in Budapest, Hungary, was most likely executed in the Soviet Union in or around 1947 after being captured by the Red Army in 1945. His death is dated by Soviet authorities as 16 July 1947, but this is disputed, and the case remains unsolved.
  In 1948, a German court ruled that the case of Hans Kammler (43), an engineer and SS commander who oversaw many Nazi construction projects, including concentration camps and, later, the V-2 missile program, died on 9 May 1945 of what was later claimed to be suicide by cyanide poisoning. Some other accounts, however, have him being killed by his own side to prevent his capture during an attack by Czech resistance fighters; others suggest those accounts of his death were put out to cover his surrender to the U.S. Army, in whose custody he supposedly hanged himself two years later.

See also

 Cold case (criminology)
 Forensic science
 List of kidnappings
 List of unsolved murders in the United Kingdom
 Lists of unsolved murders
 Lists of people by cause of death
 Lists of people who disappeared
 Unidentified decedent

References

External links

Unsolved